Elaine Viets is a Midwestern American newspaperwoman and mystery writer.

Life and career
A native of St. Louis, Missouri, Viets has a degree in journalism and became a longtime popular media figure in St. Louis. She was a regular columnist for the St. Louis Post-Dispatch for twenty-five years, her columns focusing mostly on local issues and human-interest fare. She also hosted the local light-news television program Viets Beat, for which she won Emmy Awards in 1989 and 1990. After moving to Washington, D.C. and leaving the St. Louis Post-Dispatch, Viets wrote a syndicated column carried by United Feature Syndicate and later by United Media.

She also began writing mystery novels and eventually left the newspaper business almost entirely to become a full-time novelist. Viets first drew on her professional experience to produce four novels set in St. Louis and featuring fictional St. Louis newspaper columnist Francesca Vierling (and exciting speculation over which characters might represent real-life Post-Dispatch figures).

By the time she had written the last of these, Viets had relocated to Fort Lauderdale, Florida, in 1997, which became the locale for her next novels, the Dead-End Jobs series. Viets researches these books herself by taking the same sort of low-level dead-end jobs—telemarketer, shop clerk, and so forth—as the series' protagonist, Helen Hawthorne.

Viets, married for over thirty years to author and actor Don Crinklaw, is active in the trade organizations Mystery Writers of America and Sisters in Crime. She is a board member of the Mystery Writers of America. In 2004 she was nominated for three Agatha Awards. In 2005, she won awards presented for Best Short Story at two notable mystery conventions: an Agatha Award at Malice Domestic Ltd and an Anthony Award at Bouchercon, both for her story Wedding Knife.

On April 11, 2007, Viets's fellow contributors to The Lipstick Chronicles reported that Viets had suffered a stroke. According to a subsequent update, Viets is recovering well and is again creating mysteries based on real life and the people who live it.

She appeared one the very first episode of Mythbusters during the "Biscuit Bullet" story.

Publications

Francesca Vierling, Newspaper Columnist

Dead-End Job

Josie Marcus, Mystery Shopper

Angela Richman, Death Investigator

Anthologies and collections

Other books

Related publications

References

External links
Elaine Viets' website
Southern Scribe interview with Elaine Viets
Crescent Blues interview with Elaine Viets
Writerspace interview with Elaine Viets

Year of birth missing (living people)
Agatha Award winners
American columnists
American television journalists
American mystery writers
Emmy Award winners
Novelists from Florida
Living people
Writers from St. Louis
St. Louis Post-Dispatch people
Anthony Award winners
American women columnists
Women mystery writers
American women novelists
20th-century American novelists
21st-century American novelists
20th-century American women writers
21st-century American women writers
Novelists from Missouri
American women non-fiction writers
20th-century American non-fiction writers
21st-century American non-fiction writers
American women television journalists